Ploștina may refer to several places in Romania:

 Ploștina, a village in Lopătari Commune, Buzău County
 Ploștina, a village in Melinești Commune, Dolj County
 Ploștina, a village in the town of Motru, Gorj County
 Ploștina, a village in Vrâncioaia Commune, Vrancea County
 Ploștina (river), a tributary of the river Motru in Gorj County
 Ploștina, a tributary of the river Amaradia in Dolj County